Saïmoni Vaka (born 2 June 1987) is a Fijian rugby union player. His position is wing and he currently plays for Biarritz Olympique in the Rugby Pro D2.

He began his career in Fiji before moving to SU Agen in 2007.

He joined Bayonne in 2013.

Honours
Pro D2 Champion – 2009–10

References

1987 births
Living people
Fijian rugby union players
SU Agen Lot-et-Garonne players
Rugby union wings
Fijian expatriate rugby union players
Expatriate rugby union players in France
Fijian expatriate sportspeople in France
I-Taukei Fijian people
People educated at Suva Grammar School